John "Jack" Hennessy (born July 5, 1951) is an American Democratic Party politician currently serving as a member of the Connecticut House of Representatives from the 127th district, which encompasses part of Bridgeport, since 2005.

Early life, education and military service
Hennessy was born in Norwalk, Connecticut and graduated from St. John's Preparatory School in Danvers, Massachusetts. He graduated from Boston College with a bachelor of arts in English literature in 1974. He was in the United States Army from 1974-1977, where he served in the 1st Ranger Battalion and attained the rank of Sergeant.

Career
Hennessy retired from FedEx after 32 years. He was a driver.

Political career
Hennessy was first elected in 2004, making him the longest-serving state lawmaker from Bridgeport. Hennessy was most recently elected in 2020, taking 66.4% of the vote over Republican Peter Perillo. Hennessy currently serves as a member of the house Planning and Development Committee, Environment Committee, and Finance, Revenue, and Bonding Committee.

References

External links

1951 births
Living people
21st-century American politicians
Democratic Party members of the Connecticut House of Representatives
United States Army non-commissioned officers
Politicians from Norwalk, Connecticut
Politicians from Bridgeport, Connecticut
Morrissey College of Arts & Sciences alumni
St. John's Preparatory School (Massachusetts) alumni